Barleria greenii (Green's barleria, or wild bush petunia), is a plant in the family Acanthaceae. It is endemic to a small area near Estcourt in KwaZulu-Natal, South Africa.

External links
Barleria greenii M. & K.Balkwill, PlantZAfrica.com

greenii